Vychegodsky is an urban locality (a work settlement) under the administrative jurisdiction of the town of oblast significance of Kotlas in Arkhangelsk Oblast, Russia. Population:

History
Vychegodsky was founded in 1942 in connection with the construction of the North-Pechora trunk-railway. There are three secondary schools and one vocational technical school there.

Economy

Transportation
There is a railway station in Vychegodsky, called Solvychegodsk, on the railroad connecting Kotlas and Vorkuta. Vychegodsky is located on the road connecting Kotlas and Syktyvkar via Koryazhma and Ilyinsko-Podomskoye.

See also
Administrative divisions of Arkhangelsk Oblast

References

Notes

Sources

External links
Virtual world of Vychegodsky

Urban-type settlements in Arkhangelsk Oblast